The Costa Rican Women's Premier Division is the main women's football competition in Costa Rica. It was established in 2001 and under the authority of the Women's Football Union (ADELIFE).

Format
The league is played in the Apertura and Clausura format. The Apertura is played from spring to autumn, and the Clausura from autumn to spring. In each of those the top 4 finishers play a semi-final and final. After both season halves are finished, the Apertura and Clausura champion meet in a championship final to crown the champion. Should one team have won Apertura and Clausura, it is the champion without having to play a final.

List of finals
The list of champions:

See also
 Sport in Costa Rica
 Football in Costa Rica
 Women's football in Costa Rica
 Costa Rica women's national football team

References

External links
Official website

Women's association football leagues in Central America
Women
Women's sports leagues in Costa Rica